Martin Ronald Desjardins (born January 28, 1967 in Sainte-Rose, Quebec) is a former Canadian professional ice hockey forward who played eight games in the National Hockey League (NHL) for the Montreal Canadiens.

Career statistics

External links
 

1967 births
Living people
Berlin Capitals players
Canadian ice hockey forwards
Fredericton Canadiens players
Genève-Servette HC players
Ice hockey people from Quebec
Indianapolis Ice players
Lausanne HC players
Longueuil Chevaliers players
Montreal Canadiens draft picks
Montreal Canadiens players
Sherbrooke Canadiens players
Sportspeople from Laval, Quebec
Trois-Rivières Draveurs players